Northern Command can refer to one of the following:

United States Northern Command
Northern Command (Israel)
Northern Command (Australia)
Northern Command (India)
Northern Command (RAAF)
Northern Command (United Kingdom)
IRA Northern Command